Potgieter is a Germanic occupational surname, equivalent to the English surname Potter. 

Notable people with the surname include:

Barend Potgieter (born 1994) South African rugby loosehead prop
Bradley Potgieter (born 1989), South African racing cyclist
Dewald Potgieter (born 1986), South African rugby union player
Everhardus Johannes Potgieter (1808–1875), Dutch poet
Frits Potgieter (born 1974) South African discus thrower
Gert Potgieter (born 1937), South African athlete
Gert Potgieter (1929–1977), South African opera tenor
Hein Potgieter (born 1982), South African rugby union player
Hendrik Potgieter (1792–1852), South African Republic politician
Jacques Potgieter (born 1986), South African rugby union player
Jacques-Louis Potgieter (born 1984), South African rugby union player
Karel Potgieter(born 1975), South African shotputter
Louis Potgieter (1951–1993), German pop singer
Ockert Potgieter (1965-2021) South African missionary and film director
Pieter Johannes Potgieter (1822–1854), South African politician
Yolandi Potgieter (born 1989), South African cricketer

Afrikaans-language surnames
German-language surnames
Surnames of German origin